Robert Rodney Savage (born 20 December 1960) is a former English cricketer.  Savage was a right-handed batsman.  He was born at Southampton, Hampshire.

Savage made his Minor Counties Championship debut for Wiltshire in 1986 against Dorset. From 1986 to 1995, he represented the county in 44 Minor Counties Championship matches, the last of which came against Wales Minor Counties.  Savage also represented Wiltshire in the MCCA Knockout Trophy.  His debut in that competition came against Cornwall in 1988.  From 1988 to 1994, he represented the county in 11 Trophy matches, the last of which came against Devon.

Savage also represented Wiltshire in 2 List A matches. His 2 List A matches came against Essex in the 1988 NatWest Trophy and Durham in the 1993 NatWest Trophy. In the field he took 2 catches.

References

External links
Robert Savage at Cricinfo
Robert Savage at CricketArchive

1960 births
Living people
Cricketers from Southampton
English cricketers
Wiltshire cricketers
Hampshire Cricket Board cricketers